Fuel economy may refer to:

Fuel efficiency
Fuel economy in automobiles
Fuel economy in aircraft